Barry Steven Jackson (born October 18, 1960) is the former chief of staff to U.S. House Speaker John Boehner.  He also served as Senior Advisor to the President for George W. Bush.

Personal
Barry Jackson was born in Washington, DC but grew up mostly in Ohio.  He graduated from the University of Iowa in 1983 with a bachelor's degree from the School of Journalism and Mass Communications.

His father is Cletis M. Jackson of Lebanon, Ohio, currently President and CEO of Hi-Tek Manufacturing, Inc. in Mason, Ohio, a producer of machine components.

Career

Early
In 1988, Jackson joined with his father in incorporating a now-inactive company, Regal Flush Manufacturing, Inc.

Washington
From 1991 until his initial appointment to the Bush White House, Jackson was chief of staff to Congressman John Boehner of Ohio.  He returned to this position in January 2010 after the death of Boehner's previous chief of staff, Paula Nowakowski.

White House
Jackson began his White House career in 2001, serving as a deputy to Karl Rove.  He continued in that role until Rove's resignation in 2007.

Controversies

Abramoff
In the Abramoff scandal, Jackson has been cited as a regular participant in lobbying contacts with Jack Abramoff and his staffers.

Politicization
Jackson's role in the politication of government under the administration of George W. Bush has been discussed in hearings on Capitol Hill.  Jackson has been pointed to as someone who gave advice to Drew DeBerry, a White House liaison in the Agriculture Department, regarding travel for political purposes. Jackson's role in giving presentations on political matters was also discussed in hearings.

References

External links
Jackson's donation of $2,000 to George W. Bush for Campaign 2004

1960 births
Iowa Republicans
Living people
Senior Advisors to the President of the United States
University of Iowa alumni
Political chiefs of staff
United States presidential advisors
United States congressional aides
People from Warren County, Ohio